Kresimir Marusic (born 23 November 1969) is a former Australian football player who played for several National Soccer League clubs, including Melbourne Knights, Sydney United, Carlton SC, Northern Spirit FC and Sydney Olympic. Marušić won the Johnny Warren Medal for player of the year in 1996–97 National Soccer League season.

He had also played in Croatian First League clubs NK Radnik Velika Gorica, NK Segesta Sisak, and NK Inker Zaprešić in the early 1990s and with Belgian SK Lommel in the 1999–2000 season.

References

External links
 Ozfootball stats

1969 births
Living people
Australian soccer players
Association football midfielders
HNK Segesta players
NK GOŠK Dubrovnik players
NK Inter Zaprešić players
Croatian Football League players
Carlton S.C. players
Melbourne Knights FC players
Sydney United 58 FC players
Sydney Olympic FC players
National Soccer League (Australia) players
Australian people of Croatian descent
K.F.C. Lommel S.K. players